You Only Live Twice may refer to:

 You Only Live Twice (novel), a 1964 James Bond novel by Ian Fleming
 You Only Live Twice (film), a 1967 film based on the novel
 You Only Live Twice (soundtrack), the soundtrack album from the film
 "You Only Live Twice" (song), a 1967 Nancy Sinatra song from the James Bond film of the same name
 You Only Live Twice (Tim Brummett album), a 2005 album by Tim Brummett
 You Only Live Twice (Pain album), a 2011 album by Pain
 You Only Live Twice: The Audio Graphic Novel, a 2010 album by MF Grimm
 You Only Live 2wice, a 2017 album by Freddie Gibbs
 "You Only Live Twice", an episode of 2point4 children
 Chikara You Only Live Twice, a 2014 professional wrestling event

See also
You Only Live Once (disambiguation)